William Keech (30 April 1872 – 6 September 1948) was an English professional footballer who played as a centre forward or right half in the Football League for Blackpool, Leicester Fosse, Loughborough and Liverpool. After his retirement he returned to one of his former clubs, Queens Park Rangers, as a trainer.

Career statistics

References

1872 births
1948 deaths
People from Irthlingborough
English footballers
Association football wing halves
Association football forwards
Wellingborough Town F.C. players
Kettering Town F.C. players
Barnsley F.C. players
Liverpool F.C. players
Leicester City F.C. players
Loughborough F.C. players
Queens Park Rangers F.C. players
Brentford F.C. players
Birmingham City F.C. players
English Football League players
Midland Football League players
Southern Football League players
Queens Park Rangers F.C. non-playing staff